Asmund Enger (30 September 1881 – 11 April 1966) was a Norwegian sports shooter. He competed in two events at the 1906 Intercalated Games and one event at the 1908 Summer Olympics.

References

1881 births
1966 deaths
Sportspeople from Gjøvik
Norwegian male sport shooters
Olympic shooters of Norway
Shooters at the 1906 Intercalated Games
Shooters at the 1908 Summer Olympics
20th-century Norwegian people